Holy Trinity Episcopal Church is a historic church at 105 E. Alder Street in Palouse, Washington. It was built in 1895 and was added to the National Register in 2005. The chapel has one of the seven lichgates in the United States. From 1896 through 2003 services were held at the chapel until the Episcopal Diocese of Spokane sold the building to the Whitman County Historical Society, a historical society which gives tours by request and rents out the building for weddings, funeral services, local church services, recitals, and cultural presentations.

References

Episcopal churches in Washington (state)
Churches on the National Register of Historic Places in Washington (state)
Gothic Revival church buildings in Washington (state)
Churches completed in 1895
Buildings and structures in Whitman County, Washington
19th-century Episcopal church buildings
National Register of Historic Places in Whitman County, Washington